Aarvam ( Interest) is a 2010 Indian Tamil language action film directed by Aadithyan. The film stars Satya Saleel Hussain, R. Sanjay and Meenu Karthika, with Ganja Karuppu, Ponnambalam, Karate Raja, Scissor Manohar, Bonda Mani and Vadivukkarasi playing supporting roles. The film, produced by D. Anil, had a musical score by Ronnie Raphael and was released on 22 October 2010.

Plot

Anjali, the sister of the dreaded gangster Aadhi, leaves the city and returns to her hometown after finishing her studies. The young man Mahesh (R. Zanjay), the son of a revenue inspector, falls at first sight with Anjali during the village's festival. Mahesh then proposes his love to her but she refuses to love someone she doesn't yet know. Mahesh then starts to hang out with Anjali and she eventually falls in love with him. The villagers including Mahesh are feared of Aadhi, so Mahesh prepared a master plan: he lies to the innocent Sathya (Satya) that Anjali is in love with him. The village milkman Sathya who is from a poor background lives with widowed mother, little sister and uncle. Thereafter, Sathya falls in love with Anjali and changes his look to please Anjali.

When Aadhi learns about his sister's love affair, he sends his henchmen to beat up Sathya but Sathya surprisingly overcomes them. Later, Aadhi kills the brother of his archenemy Pandi and convinces him that the killer was no other than the innocent Sathya. A vengeful Pandi and his henchmen go to Sathya's house and beat up his family, Sathya defeats them. Aadhi then makes everything to portray Sathya as rowdy so his sister will avoid him. Afterwards, Anjali tells Sathya that she doesn't love him but she is in love with Mahesh. The heartbroken Sathya genuinely accepts his fate and he is disgusted by Mahesh's cheap mindset.

In reality, Mahesh wants to marry Anjali to get rich. Aadhi finally accepts for the marriage between Mahesh and his sister. However, Anjali finds out that Mahesh is a bad person thus the wedding is cancelled. In the meantime, Pandi and his henchmen beat the harmless Sathya to death. The film ends with Anjali mourning the death of Sathya.

The film depicts that true love is such a powerful force. It's there for everyone to embrace-that kind of unconditional love for all of humankind. That is the kind of love that impels people to go into the community and try to change conditions for others, to take risks for what they believe in.

Cast

Satya Saleel Hussain as Sathya
R. Sanjay as Mahesh
Meenu Karthika as Anjali
Ganja Karuppu as Tea master
Ponnambalam as Pandi
Karate Raja as Aadhi
Scissor Manohar as Sathya's uncle
Bonda Mani as Mani
Vadivukkarasi as Sathya's mother
Malaysia Jennifer
Preethi Pushpan
Divya
Remya

Production
After the poor performance of Paadagasalai (2010) in the box-office, the film producer Anil Dev(Anil.D) returned with Aarvam under the banner of Movie Dreams. Satya and R. Sanjay, who played the lead roles in Paadagasalai, will be once again joining hands with the producer while Kerala-based Meenu Karthika was selected to be the heroine. Apart from the film director Adithyan, the hero Satya, the film's producer Anil Dev(Anil.D), music director Ronnie Raphael, art director Anil Sreeragam and make-up man Binoy are the other Malayalis behind Aarvam. The film was based on a real incident that took place in Madurai some years ago and it was shot in Tenkasi, Courtallam and Madurai.

Soundtrack

The film score and the soundtrack were composed by Ronnie Raphael. The soundtrack features 6 tracks.

Release
The film was released on 22 October 2010 alongside four other films.

References

External links

2010 films
2010s Tamil-language films
Films shot in Madurai
Films set in Madurai
Indian action films
2010 directorial debut films
2010 action films